The Trials of Rosie O'Neill is an American drama television series which aired on CBS from September 17, 1990 to May 30, 1992. The show stars Sharon Gless as Fiona Rose "Rosie" O'Neill, a lawyer working in the public defender's office for the City of Los Angeles. The show marked the return of Gless to series television after her run on Cagney & Lacey.

"Rosie" was created by Beth Sullivan and Joe Cacaci, and produced by Cagney & Lacey producer Barney Rosenzweig, whom Gless married in 1991. The writing staff included Beth Sullivan, Joe Cacaci, Josef Anderson, Nicole Yorkin and Dawn Prestwich. The show was cancelled by CBS in 1992.

Plot 
Each episode opens with Rosie talking with her therapist (Rosenzweig), whose face was never seen on camera. Rosie had been at the receiving end of an unwanted divorce, after her attorney husband had an affair.  The advertisement for the series which appeared in TV Guide the night the series debuted told the story as follows:  "I'm 43 and divorced. He got our law practice, the Mercedes, and the dog. It's only fair that I should be angry. I really liked that dog."

Cast 
The show's cast also included Dorian Harewood, Ron Rifkin, Georgann Johnson, Lisa Rieffel and Robert Wagner. Season 2 saw two new cast additions: Ed Asner joined the cast as the cantankerous Kovac, a retired cop hired by Rosie's law firm as one of their investigators. David Rasche was cast in a recurring dramatic role as Patrick Ginty, Rosie's ex-husband who was often referred to but never seen in the first season. Adding Asner to the regular cast squeezed out Dorian Harewood, who was billed as "Special Guest Star" in all season 2 episodes.

Episodes

Season 1: 1990–91

Season 2: 1991–92

Notability 
The series received some notoriety for its debut episode in which O'Neill jokes about getting breast augmentation surgery. She does so by asking if she "should get my tits done". The use of the word "tits" (famously cited by George Carlin as one of the seven dirty words that could not be said on television or radio) led to some controversy.

On a different note, the series was notable for being one of the few television shows to include an observant Jew—Ben Meyer, Rosie's boss, played by Ron Rifkin—as a regular character. Equally notable is that, although the Meyer character wore a kippah (skullcap), his religious identity was, with the exception of occasional instances when it figured directly in the plot, usually treated casually and without overt mention, without either melodrama or condescension.

Theme song 
The theme song, entitled "I Wish I Knew", was written by Carole King and performed over the first season's credits by Melissa Manchester.  Carole King made a guest appearance in a first season episode, performing an extended version of the song herself along with Gless and a few other series guests. The second season's intro (changed to the dismay of many fans) dropped the Manchester vocals, instead using an instrumental version of the theme.  The series would revert to Manchester's vocal later on in the second season, prior to the cancellation by CBS.

Reception
The show gained a modest reception from critics.

For the episode, State of Mind, in which Rosie becomes preoccupied with curing the ills of a system that allows Irene Hayes (Peggy McCay), a mentally unstable woman, to live on the streets,  McCay was awarded a Primetime Emmy for Outstanding Guest Actress in a Drama Series.

References

External links

1990s American drama television series
1990 American television series debuts
1992 American television series endings
American legal drama television series
CBS original programming
1990s American legal television series
Primetime Emmy Award-winning television series
Television shows set in Los Angeles
Television series by MTM Enterprises
English-language television shows